Green Ronin Publishing is an American company based in Seattle, Washington. Founded in 2000 by Chris Pramas and Nicole Lindroos, they have published several role-playing game–related products. They won several awards for their games including multiple Origins, ENnie, Pen & Paper, and Inquest Fan Awards.

History
In early 1996, Chris Pramas acquired The Whispering Vault rights from Mike Nystul and formed Ronin Publishing with his brother, Jason Pramas, and their mutual friend, Neal Darcy. The company published two role playing game supplements, The Book of Hunts (1997) for The Whispering Vault and Blood of the Valiant for Feng Shui. Ronin Publishing came to an end when Chris Pramas went to work for Wizards of the Coast in 1998.

Pramas founded Green Ronin Publishing with his wife Nicole Lindroos in 2000. Green Ronin published its first book in July 2000: Ork! (2000), a beer and pretzels RPG about playing orks. Working at Wizards of the Coast, Pramas had inside information on the d20 license, and Green Ronin's lead d20 offering, Death in Freeport (2000) went on sale on August 10, 2000, the same day as the new third edition Player's Handbook (2000) for D&D. In 2001, Green Ronin expanded beyond their early Freeport adventures and went into the business of publishing sourcebooks and other gaming material. In March 2002, Pramas was laid off from Wizards of the Coast and took this as an opportunity to go full-time with Green Ronin, doubling the company's production that year. Green Ronin's first new RPG was Spaceship Zero (2002); Toren Atkinson of the rock band The Darkest of the Hillside Thickets had contributed artwork to Ork! and Death in Freeport and asked Pramas to publish a game based on the band's album Spaceship Zero Original Motion Picture Soundtrack (2000). Green Ronin's other RPG of the year was Mutants & Masterminds (2002), created by Steve Kenson who Pramas had asked to design a new d20-based superhero RPG based on his freelance work on a number of superhero RPGs. In 2003, former Pinnacle Entertainment Group graphic designer, art director and Deadlands RPG brand manager Hal Mangold joined as partner, and the company formally established itself as an LLC. Mangold was Green Ronin's primary graphic designer and art director on a freelance basis since soon after the company's founding, doing the layout and design for the majority of the company's print output. (Ork!, laid out by Nicole Lindroos, and the Mutants & Masterminds game line, handled by the Super Unicorn design studio, were notable exceptions.)

On May 12, 2010, Green Ronin Publishing announced a third edition of the superhero role-playing game Mutants & Masterminds would debut in the fall. This announcement came just nine days after the publisher announced that it would debut a new DC Adventures game in August, based upon Mutants & Masterminds. According to Green Ronin President Chris Pramas, the two new games will "share a common ruleset."

In 2013, Green Ronin Publishing used crowdfunding platform Kickstarter to redesign and enlarge the Freeport campaign setting for the Pathfinder Roleplaying Game.

Games and products
Green Ronin wrote the second edition of Warhammer Fantasy Roleplay, which was published by Black Industries. Other notable products include Freeport: The City of Adventure, "Green Ronin’s signature city setting" and "home to thousands of RPG campaigns since its launch in 2000", Thieves' World, and The Black Company d20 settings, Mutants & Masterminds, Blue Rose, and True20. Licensed products include the A Song of Ice and Fire Roleplaying game, the Dragon Age roleplaying game, and DC Adventures, a licensed roleplaying game based on the characters and setting found in DC Comics.

The Spirosblaak (2005) setting from Green Ronin's Mythic Vistas series was supported by Misfit Studios. They also created Fantasy AGE using the 'Adventure Game Engine' (source: [6])

Reception
Green Ronin Publishing won the 2003 Silver Ennie Award for "Best Publisher", and again in 2004, and the Gold for "Best Publisher" and Silver for "Fan's Choice for Best Publisher" in 2005, and Gold for "Fan's Choice for Best Publisher" in 2006.

References

6.  https://books.google.com/books/about/Fantasy_Age_Basic_Rulebook.html?id=5O6xAQAACAAJ&source=kp_book_description

External links

Companies based in Seattle
ENnies winners
Publishing companies established in 2000
Role-playing game publishing companies